Degen is a surname of Swiss, German or Croatian origin.
There are numerous unrelated families sharing the name, which can originate in a number of given names beginning in Degen- ("hero"); compare the Degener surname, from the German given name Degenher.

A family called Degen originally from Muotathal, Schwyz, rose to some prominence in the Swiss Confederacy in the 16th century.
Members of the family were reeves in Riviera, Gaster, Blenio, Thurgau, and Landammann in March. This family was extinct in 1826.
 
Notable people with the surname include:
Carl Ferdinand Degen (1766–1825), Danish mathematician
Árpád Degen (1866–1934), Hungarian biologist and botanist
Hans Degen (1899–1971), German World War II general
Ion Degen (1925–2017), Soviet and Israeli writer and physician.
Michael Degen (1932–2022), German-Israeli actor
Paul Degen (1941–2007), Swiss artist
Silvije Degen (born 1942), Croatian politician
Bob Degen (born 1944), American jazz pianist
Bruce Degen (born 1945), American author and illustrator
Sandra J. F. Degen (born c. 1955), American biochemist and molecular geneticist
Jürgen Degen (born 1967), German footballer
Philipp Degen (born 1983), Swiss footballer
David Degen (born 1983), Swiss footballer

References

Surnames from given names
German-language surnames